Yengejeh is a village in Shaban Rural District, in the Central District of Meshgin Shahr County, Ardabil Province, Iran. At the 2006 census, its population was 208, in 41 families.

References 

Towns and villages in Meshgin Shahr County